Kevin Vidal is a Canadian actor. He is most noted for his starring role in the comedy television series Sunnyside, for which he and the other core cast collectively won the Canadian Screen Award for Best Performance in a Variety or Sketch Comedy Program or Series at the 4th Canadian Screen Awards in 2016.

A graduate of the actor training program at the Toronto company of The Second City, he subsequently appeared in several shows for the company including We Can Be Heroes, The Second City Guide to the Symphony and the Canadian Comedy Award-winning Sixteen Scandals.

He has also had roles in the television series Kim's Convenience, Workin' Moms and Strays, the web series But I'm Chris Jericho!, Gary and His Demons and Soul Decision, the films The Parting Glass and The Bet, and on stage in a production of Come from Away.

Vidal is bisexual.

References

External links

21st-century Canadian male actors
Canadian male television actors
Canadian male film actors
Canadian male voice actors
Canadian male stage actors
Canadian male musical theatre actors
Canadian sketch comedians
Black Canadian male actors
Black Canadian LGBT people
Canadian LGBT actors
Bisexual male actors
Living people
Canadian Screen Award winners
Year of birth missing (living people)
21st-century Canadian LGBT people